Pawcatuck is a village and census-designated place (CDP) in the town of Stonington which is located in New London County, Connecticut. The population was 5,624 at the 2010 census. It is located across the Pawcatuck River from Downtown Westerly, Rhode Island. The Mechanic Street Historic District of Pawcatuck is listed on the National Register of Historic Places and includes sites of shipbuilding, mills, and worker housing in a  area.

Demographics
The village of Pawcatuck has a total area of  bordered to the east by the Pawcatuck River. As of the census of 2000, there were 5,474 people, 2,427 households, and 1,439 families residing in the village. The racial makeup was 93.53% White, 0.75% African American, 0.69% Native American, 2.12% Asian, 0.05% Pacific Islander, 0.69% from other races, and 2.16% from two or more races. Hispanic or Latino of any race were 1.44% of the population. The median income for a household in Pawcatuck was $39,799, and the median income for a family was $53,087, and 9.3% of the population was below the poverty line.

See also

References

Census-designated places in New London County, Connecticut
Stonington, Connecticut
Tourist attractions in New London County, Connecticut
Villages in Connecticut